W. Griffith was the second head football coach for Washburn University in Topeka, Kansas, and he held that position for the 1896 season. His overall coaching record at Washburn was 6 wins, 1 loss, and 1 tie. He ranks 24th at Washburn in terms of total wins.

Head coaching record

References

Year of birth missing
Year of death missing
Washburn Ichabods football coaches